Sidney Abrahams (August 3, 1915 – July 27, 1983) was a West Indian cricketer, who played for Jamaica in first-class cricket.

References

External links
player profile on ESPN Cricinfo

1915 births
Jamaican cricketers
1983 deaths
Jamaica cricketers